Further Drachenstich is a theatre festival in Furth im Wald, Bavaria, Germany. It is the oldest popular theatre in Germany, dating back to 1590.

Theatre festivals in Germany

Drachenstich is a German festival held in furth im wald, there is a dragon slaying play.